Maria Klavdievna Tenisheva (née Pyatkovskaya, in the first marriage – Nikolaeva, (20 May 1858 – 14 April 1928) was a Russian Princess, artist, educator, philanthropist and collector. She was born May 20, 1858, in St. Petersburg. Maria Tenisheva is famous as the founder of the Art studio in St. Petersburg, and the Drawing School at the Museum of Russian antiquity in Smolensk, handicraft college in Bezhitsa town, as well as by artistic and industrial workshops held in her own estate of Talashkino.

Biography 
Maria Pyatkovskaya was born on May 20, (June 1) 1858 in St. Petersburg. The girl was illegitimate, and grew up in her stepfather's wealthy house; she was quite a shy girl, despite many governesses, nurses and teachers present in the house. Little Maria was expected to be obedient and restraint. His mother was cold to her, apparently binding to this child the moments of her life which she was trying to forget.

When 16-year-old Maria graduated from private school, Rafail Nikolaev, a young lawyer, proposed to her. The idea that the marriage would give her freedom pushed her to give her consent. The couple had a daughter, also named Maria, but the marriage did not work out, as the husband was a gambler. "Everything was so gray and ordinary, meaningless," she wrote later. Soon Maria Tenisheva went to Paris to study singing with the famous Marchesi. She had a beautiful soprano. Maria also took her little daughter to France. That was a really tough time for Maria, as her husband refused to grant her permit to leave and her mother also stopped her allowance. Maria took singing lessons with Mathilde Marchesi, and also graphics lessons. Marchesi was sure that her student was born to have the glory of Russian opera singer. Maria was offered to take a tour of France and Spain. But due to a conflict with the entrepreneur, Maria refused to go, moreover, she decided that singing and stage performance were not for her. Upon returning to St. Petersburg, she attended Baron von Stieglitz classes. At the time, Maria studied the history of art and spent time reading books and visiting museums.

In 1892, Maria married Prince Vyacheslav Nikolayevich Tenishev, an outstanding Russian manufacturer. However, his relatives did not recognize Maria, and she was not inscribed into the Tenishev genealogy. The couple settled in the Khotylevo estate acquired by Prince Tenishev in Bryansky district, Orel province. The estate was situated on the banks of the Desna river, where the princess founded a one-class school. 
Princess Tenisheva had great artistic taste. She collected watercolors and befriended famous artists, including Vasnetsov, Vrubel, Roerich, Malyutin, Benois, the sculptor Paolo Troubetzkoy, and many others. She set up an art studio to prepare young people for higher arts education in St. Petersburg (1894–1904), where Ilya Repin taught.

Maria Tenisheva was also one of the founders of the Mir Iskusstva (World of Arts) magazine.

When traveling with her husband to Europe, the princess had no financial restraints and bought Western European paintings, porcelain, marble sculptures, jewelry, and historic valuables of China, Japan and Iran. When she and her husband went traveling through the old Russian towns of Rostov, Rybinsk, Kostroma, and the Volga region villages and monasteries, the handmade beauty crafted by unknown masters made her start a collection of utensils, clothing, furniture, jewelry, and glassware.

In 1893, Maria Tenisheva persuaded her friend, Princess Catherine Svyatopolk-Chetverinskaya, to sell her ancestral estate Talashkino, and there she quickly created a welcoming, creative atmosphere that attracted many famous artists, musicians, and scientists: Ilya Repin, Nicholas Roerich, Mikhail Vrubel, and many others. Talashkino became the princess' lifework. 
In September 1895, thanks to the princess' efforts to erect a new building with dormitories, a dining room and a kitchen, a school opened for village children near Talashkino. Orphans had privileged entry, and Princess Tenisheva gave them full pension.

In 1919, after the Revolution, Princess Maria Tenisheva, together with her friend, Princess Catherine Svyatopolk-Chetverinskaya, and her assistants, left Russia for France. During her exile in Paris, she wrote her memoir, called "Impressions of my life. Memories", that covered the period from the late 1860s to New Year's Eve 1917. The book was published only after her death. Princess Maria Tenisheva died on April 14, 1928 in her house "Iris Cottage", located in the Parisian suburb of La Celle Saint-Cloud. In the obituary, Ivan Bilibin wrote: "Her whole life was dedicated to native Russian art, and she has done infinitely much for it."

References 

1858 births
1928 deaths
Russian women painters
Russian women artists
Russian princesses